Muhammad Juzaili Samion (born 18 May 1981) is a former Malaysian footballer who currently works as an assistant coach for UKM.

He is one of Malaysian player that have trial with SV Wehen, club from Germany. He made his first appearance with Malaysia in under 23 level during the 2001 Southeast Asian Games where Malaysia finish as runners-up. On senior level, he made his debut against Hong Kong during the 2002 FIFA World Cup qualification (AFC).

Honours
Pahang 
 Malaysia Super League: 2004
 Piala FA: 2006
UPB Myteam 
Liga Premier:  2007
Felda United FC
 Liga Premier: 2010
Sime Darby FC
 Liga Premier: 2013
 Liga FAM: 2017

References

 

Malaysian people of Malay descent
Malaysian footballers
Malaysia international footballers
1981 births
Living people
Malaysian expatriate footballers
Malaysian expatriate sportspeople in Germany
Expatriate footballers in Germany
Malaysian expatriate sportspeople in France
Expatriate footballers in France
People from Pahang
Sri Pahang FC players
Felda United F.C. players
Sime Darby F.C. players
Malaysia Super League players
Association football defenders
Footballers at the 2002 Asian Games
Southeast Asian Games bronze medalists for Malaysia
Southeast Asian Games medalists in football
Competitors at the 2001 Southeast Asian Games
Asian Games competitors for Malaysia